Richard Buckner may refer to:

 Richard Buckner (artist) (1812–1883), English portrait painter
 Richard Aylett Buckner (1763–1847), United States Representative from Kentucky
 Richard Buckner (musician),  American singer-songwriter
 Richard Buckner (burgess) (?–c. 1733), colonial Virginian politician